Stevenson School (also known as Robert Louis Stevenson School and abbreviated as RLS) is a coeducational, private school for boarding and day students in preschool through twelfth grade. Its high school and Pre-K through eighth-grade campuses are located in Pebble Beach and an unincorporated area of neighboring Carmel, respectively.

History

In 1925, Grace Parsons Douglas (1880-1968) founded the Douglas Camp School for Girls in Pebble Beach after purchasing the land on the Monterey Peninsula from Samuel Finley Brown Morse. After operating the school for a quarter century, the school was sold in May 1952 to Robert and Marian Ricklefs and became the Del Monte School for Boys, then the Robert Louis Stevenson, which they named in honor of Robert Louis Stevenson, the well-known Scottish author who reportedly found inspiration for his tales of high adventure during his 1870s sojourn in the Monterey area. Many of the school buildings, the school newspaper, sports teams, and other features of the school are named for places or themes from Robert Louis Stevenson's life or writings.

In the early years, Stevenson was a boys' school offering education in grades 7-12, though grades 7-8 were discontinued when the high school expanded.

The Pebble Beach Campus has had an Episcopalian chaplain from the early days, though the school has always been open to students of all faiths. The school considers itself to be non-sectarian and explicit religious instruction is not included in the curriculum. In 1987, the Church in the Forest was established in Erdman Memorial Chapel on the Pebble Beach campus, initially with both Episcopalian and Methodist chaplains. The chapel is used by some local residents, and is where boarding students attend vespers.

Robert Ricklefs served as headmaster until he retired in 1970; he was succeeded by Gordon Davis, during whose term (1970–1982) the school opened its doors to girls as day students (1976).

Joe Wandke arrived in 1983, and during his administration the school has undergone a thorough renovation of the physical plant. In 1988 girls were first admitted as boarding students with the opening of the Silverado dormitory.

Also in 1988, the school was approached by the board of Briarcliff Academy, a private elementary school in the unincorporated area of Carmel Woods, north of Carmel, regarding a merger of the two schools. Stevenson then became a two-campus school comprising grades kindergarten through 12. The Carmel Campus (grades K through 8, adding Pre-K in September 2011) is located in Carmel, while the Pebble Beach Campus (grades 9-12) occupies the original school's location in Pebble Beach.

In 2003 the Rosen Family Student Center was opened. Located in the middle of the Pebble Beach campus, the building features a college center, photography lab, tech center, activities center, wilderness center, multiple classrooms, and the new location of KSPB 91.9. The building is decorated with plush rugs and also features an amphitheater stage, which hosts school assemblies and concerts.

In 2015, it was announced that Stevenson graduate Kevin Hicks would succeed Wandke as president.

In September 2022, President Hicks was placed on temporary administrative leave from Stevenson School pending an independent inquiry into certain employee concerns that were voiced to the board.

Extracurricular activities

Athletics

Stevenson fields varsity teams in tennis, golf, baseball, basketball, American football, lacrosse, field hockey, swimming, water polo, and sailing, among others. In 2018, Stevenson installed a new AstroTurf field for soccer and lacrosse. Historically, Stevenson has fielded strong teams in tennis, golf, lacrosse, and soccer. Stevenson's athletic director Justin Clymo was awarded the Golden Whistle Award in February 2019.

Stevenson also hosts the Stevenson Lacrosse Camp each year in July.

Clubs and activities

The school is home to KSPB 91.9 FM. Other clubs include international debate societies such as Model UN, music and athletic fan clubs, Amnesty International, community service groups such as the Red Cross Club, and a competitive robotics team.

Arts

Stevenson offers courses in both the fine and performing arts including levels of drama, choir, radio and media, drawing and painting, filmmaking and ceramics. Each year the school puts on two plays and one musical in Keck Auditorium located on the Pebble Beach campus.

Academic program

Stevenson offers a wide range of courses geared to prepare students for further study at colleges and universities around the world. Students take courses in English, fine arts, foreign languages (currently Latin, French, Spanish, Chinese and Japanese), history, mathematics, science, technology and outdoor education. The school also has a long history of hosting AFS exchange students. Several students participate in study abroad programs each year.

Stevenson students have a long history of attending universities all over the United States. Popular choices include UCLA, USC, and LMU. Nearly 100% of Stevenson graduates continue their education elsewhere.

Notable graduates

 Christian Cévaër, professional golfer
 Bobby Clampett, former professional golfer, commentator
 Paul Dini, TV show creator, producer, and director
 Alison Eastwood, actor
 Francesca Fisher, actor
 Andrew Firestone, winemaker and reality TV subject
 MC Lars, musician
 Rachel Luba, sports agent
 Marie Mutsuki Mockett, writer
 Patrick O'Neal, sportscaster
 Heather Pease, Olympic gold medalist in synchronized swimming
 Kristoffer Polaha, actor and director
 Alexander Wang, fashion designer (attended ninth grade)
 Sylvain White, music video and movie director
 Andrew Rosen, co-founder of fashion firm Theory, Inc.
 Adam Kokesh, libertarian political activist
 Tasha Reign, adult film star
Susan Slusser, baseball writer

References

External links
 

Stevenson School official website
The Church in the Forest
KSPB radio station
Stevenson official Facebook page
The Association of Boarding Schools profile

Boarding schools in California
High schools in Monterey County, California
Educational institutions established in 1952
Private high schools in California
Private middle schools in California
Private elementary schools in California
Pebble Beach, California
Carmel-by-the-Sea, California
1952 establishments in California